Last Kingdom is a video game developed and published by Netamin.com for the PC.

Gameplay
Last Kingdom is an MMORPG in which players start as peasants and gain experience points to progress in character classes.

Reception
Carla Harker reviewed the PC version of the game for Next Generation, rating it one star out of five, and stated that "It's free to try, but who'd want to pay for this mess?"

Reviews
Computer Games Magazine #124
https://web.archive.org/web/20010528194548/http://stratics.com/content/news/arc9-2000.shtml
https://www.eurogamer.net/articles/article_29391
https://web.archive.org/web/20010215122948/http://www.netamin.com/Netaminsite/Home/homepage.asp
https://web.archive.org/web/20010215122232/http://www.netamin.com/NetaminSite/Beta_LastKingdom/lastKingdom_home.html
https://web.archive.org/web/20010611194606/http://download.netamin.com/manual.pdf
https://web.archive.org/web/20001012063336/http://www.netamin.net/grand_opening.asp
https://web.archive.org/web/20010528194548/http://stratics.com/content/news/arc9-2000.shtml
https://web.archive.org/web/20010420152008/http://www.fileplanet.com/index.asp?file=50897

References

Massively multiplayer online role-playing games